TV Heaven, Telly Hell is a comedy television show on Channel 4, presented and produced by Sean Lock. The format is similar to Room 101, with guests discussing their likes and dislikes of items on television.

The show also allows the guest to reconstruct any moment in television history in the way they wanted it to happen, in a short sketch shown at the end of the show usually parodying a clip discussed earlier.

Guests

Series 1

Series 2

External links

2006 British television series debuts
2007 British television series endings
2000s British comedy television series
Channel 4 original programming
Channel 4 comedy
Television series by All3Media
English-language television shows